The 1993 Virginia Tech Hokies football team represented the Virginia Polytechnic Institute and State University during the 1993 NCAA Division I-A football season. The team's head coach was Frank Beamer.

Schedule

Rankings

References

Virginia Tech
Virginia Tech Hokies football seasons
Independence Bowl champion seasons
Virginia Tech Hokies football